A number of varieties of Homo are grouped into the broad category of archaic humans in the period that precedes and is contemporary to the emergence of the earliest early modern humans (Homo sapiens) around 300 ka. Among the earliest remains of H. sapiens are Omo-Kibish I (Omo I) from southern Ethiopia ( 195 or 233 ka), the remains from Jebel Irhoud in Morocco (about 315 ka) and Florisbad in South Africa (259 ka). The term typically includes Neanderthals (H. neanderthalensis; 430 ± 25 ka), Denisovans, H. rhodesiensis (300–125 ka), H. heidelbergensis (600–200 ka), H. naledi, H. ergaster, H. antecessor, and H. habilis.

Archaic humans had a brain size averaging 1,200 to 1,400 cubic centimeters, which overlaps with the range of modern humans. Archaics are distinguished from anatomically modern humans by having a thick skull, prominent supraorbital ridges (brow ridges) and the lack of a prominent chin.

Anatomically modern humans appeared around 300,000 years ago in Africa, and 70,000 years ago, gradually supplanted the "archaic" human varieties. Non-modern varieties of Homo are certain to have survived until after 30,000 years ago, and perhaps until as recently as 12,000 years ago. According to recent genetic studies, modern humans may have bred with two or more groups of archaic humans, including Neanderthals and Denisovans. Other studies have cast doubt on admixture being the source of the shared genetic markers between archaic and modern humans, pointing to an ancestral origin of the traits which originated 500,000–800,000 years ago.

Terminology and definition 
The category archaic human lacks a single, agreed definition. According to one definition, Homo sapiens is a single species comprising several subspecies that include the archaics and modern humans. Under this definition, modern humans are referred to as Homo sapiens sapiens and archaics are also designated with the prefix "Homo sapiens". For example, the Neanderthals are Homo sapiens neanderthalensis, and Homo heidelbergensis is Homo sapiens heidelbergensis. Other taxonomists prefer not to consider archaics and modern humans as a single species but as several different species. In this case the standard taxonomy is used, i.e. Homo rhodesiensis, or Homo neanderthalensis.

The evolutionary dividing lines that separate modern humans from archaic humans and archaic humans from Homo erectus are unclear. The earliest known fossils of anatomically modern humans such as the Omo remains from 195,000 years ago, Homo sapiens idaltu from 160,000 years ago, and Qafzeh remains from 90,000 years ago are recognizably modern humans. However, these early modern humans do possess a number of archaic traits, such as moderate, but not prominent, brow ridges.

Brain size expansion 

The emergence of archaic humans is sometimes used as an example of punctuated equilibrium. This occurs when a species undergoes significant biological evolution within a relatively short period. Subsequently, the species undergoes very little change for long periods until the next punctuation. Since the peak of human brain size during the archaics, it has begun to decline.

Origin of language 

Robin Dunbar has argued that archaic humans were the first to use language. Based on his analysis of the relationship between brain size and hominin group size, he concluded that because archaic humans had large brains, they must have lived in groups of over 120 individuals. Dunbar argues that it was not possible for hominins to live in such large groups without using language, otherwise there could be no group cohesion and the group would disintegrate. By comparison, chimpanzees live in smaller groups of up to 50 individuals.

Fossils 

 Atapuerca Mountains, Sima de los Huesos
 Saldanha man
 Altamura Man
 Kabwe skull
 Steinheim skull
 Ndutu cranium
 Dragon Man
 Cro-magnon Man

See also 

 Dawn of Humanity (2015 PBS film)
 Early human migrations
 Evolution of human intelligence
 Human evolution
 Interbreeding between archaic and modern humans
 Middle Paleolithic
 Neanderthal extinction
 Recent African origin of modern humans
 Toba catastrophe theory

References 
Footnotes

Citations

External links 
 Early and Late "Archaic" Homo Sapiens and "Anatomically Modern" Homo Sapiens
 Origins of Modern Humans: Multiregional or Out of Africa?
 Homo sapiens, Museum of Natural History
 Human Timeline (Interactive) – Smithsonian, National Museum of Natural History (August 2016).

Middle Stone Age
Paleoanthropology
Human populations
 Recent African origin of modern humans
Human evolution